Silambu (/cil’əmpɨ̆/), or Gaggara (Tulu: ಗಗ್ಗರ), is an anklet worn and used in a variety of contexts on the Indian subcontinent.

Etymology 
According to Jeyaraj, the word 'silambu' is derived from the verb 'silambal', meaning 'to make sound'.

Description 
The silambu is a hollow anklet filled with beads that produce noise when the wearer moves or dances. It may be worn on the ankle or the leg. When worn on the leg, it is termed kālchilambu in Tamil.

Some varieties of silambu are made of copper and use iron balls to produce sound. Others are made of silver.

Importance

In dance 
Nautch performers wore silambu. Kandyan dancers may wear silambu.

In art and literature 

Shiva in his dancing pose nataraja sometimes wears a silambu on his ankle.

The epic Silappatikaram is structured around the character Kannaki's attempt to sell her silambu, and takes its title from the name of the anklet.

In religion and rituals 
Silambu are sometimes placed on cows' legs during the Pongal festival. In Tamil Nadu, a traditional dance called kai silambu aatam is performed in temples during Amman festivals in which the dancers wear or hold silambus in their hands, which make noise when shaken. 

Silambu is also used in ritual dance performances of southern India, such as the Theyyam of Malabar region and the Buta Kola of Tulu Nadu region.

See also

Jewellery of Tamil Nadu

Notes

Sources 

 
 

Types of jewellery
Tamil culture
Indian musical instruments